Cartoon Network (often abbreviated as CN) is an Indian cable and satellite television channel operated by Warner Bros. Discovery under its international division. The channel is the Indian equivalent to the original American network and was launched on 1 May 1995 as the first television network in India dedicated to children. The channel primarily airs animated programming.

History

Launch

Cartoon Network was the first dedicated children's television channel in India, which was launched on 1 May 1995, as a dual-channel with Cartoon Network operating from 5:30 a.m. to 5:30 p.m. (later 9:00 p.m.) and Turner Classic Movies (formerly TNT) taking up the remainder of the daily schedule. On 1 July 2001, Cartoon Network India commenced daily full-day broadcasts.

In early 2004, a separate feed of the channel dedicated to Pakistani and Bangladeshi viewers was launched.

1990s
Cartoon Network India initially only aired Hanna-Barbera cartoons such as The Yogi Bear Show, Top Cat, The Flintstones, and Scooby-Doo. The channel quickly started to develop, with them airing MGM cartoons such as Tom and Jerry, Droopy, and Spike and Tyke for the first time in 1996, and after Time Warner's purchase of Turner in 1996, Warner Bros. produced cartoons such as Looney Tunes in 1997. In 1998, Cartoon Network India began airing Cartoon Network originals, such as Space Ghost Coast to Coast and The Moxy Show.

On 4 January 1999, the channel started to offer Hindi-dubbed versions of its shows, such as Scooby-Doo, Where Are You!, The Flintstones, The Jetsons, Speed Racer, SWAT Kats: The Radical Squadron, The Mask: The Animated Series, The Addams Family, The Real Adventures of Jonny Quest, Captain Planet, and certain other select programs.

On 23 August 1999, the channel received a rebrand, introducing new bumpers, new shows and a new "powerhouse" theme. The new shows for 1999 were its original shows Dexter's Laboratory, Cow & Chicken, I Am Weasel, Ed, Edd n' Eddy, and Johnny Bravo.

2000s
The following year, 2000, saw more Cartoon Network originals being introduced, including The Powerpuff Girls, Mike, Lu & Og, and Courage the Cowardly Dog. DC Animated Universe series started premiering in 2000s starting with Batman: The Animated Series (2000) followed by The Adventures of Batman and Robin (2000), The New Batman Adventures (2000), Batman Beyond (2001), Superman: The Animated Series (2001), and Justice League (2002). On 28 February 2000, a Tamil feed was launched on the network.

In 2001, Sheep in the Big City, Time Squad, and Samurai Jack premiered in India. On 1 July 2001, Cartoon Network became a 24-hour channel.

In September 2001, the Toonami block was introduced that primarily consists of Japanese anime and occasionally American action animation like Dragon Ball Z, Inazuma Eleven, Transformers: Robots in Disguise, and Superman: The Animated Series. A Night Shift block was introduced in November 2001 to target teens and adults. The programming included Birdman and the Galaxy Trio, The Brak Show, Galtar and the Golden Lance, and Harvey Birdman, Attorney at Law.
 
In 2002, Cartoon Network signed deal with Mattel to air Barbie films starting with Barbie as Rapunzel, which premiered on 4 November 2002.

On 27 January 2003, Tiny TV, a preschool programming block, was launched. This block was later shifted to sister channel Pogo TV. The channel also started acquiring local series and films in 2003 starting with The Adventures of Tenali Raman. Other acquisitions include series like The Adventures of Chhota Birbal, Akbar and Birbal, Jungle Tales and television films like Vikram and Betaal. Pokémon series was launched on 26 May 2003.

The anime series Beyblade was also launched on 3 June 2005, which enjoyed a No. 1 or No. 2 position in the kids genre, along with Pokémon.

On 1 October 2005, the bumpers were replaced with 3D animations of the 'CN (Cartoon Network) City' that all the Cartoon Network toon characters lived in. Show-specific bumpers were replaced with 3D animations of a well-known scene from the particular show (e.g., a Dexter's Laboratory bumper would feature Dexter's house, a Powerpuff Girls bumper would feature most likely the PPG household, and so forth). The retro checkerboard logo was replaced with the new 'CN' city-style logo.

The Life and Times of Juniper Lee premiered on CN India on 11 September 2005.

Cartoon Network continued to air new episodes and seasons from Beyblade, Pokémon, and their movies, which continued to rank No. 1 and No. 2 in the kids' genre. Half Ticket Express a preschool block was launched which aired series like Dragon Tales, Franklin, and The Koala Brothers. Another programming block Thoda Meow Thoda Bow featuring Tom and Jerry, Scooby-Doo, and The Sylvester & Tweety Mysteries was launched on Children's Day.

In 2005, Cartoon Network aired an television special with Aamir Khan to promote Mangal Pandey: The Rising. In this interview style special Khan is interviewed by Johnny Bravo.

Camp Lazlo was launched on 12 February 2006.

On 10 October 2006, Cartoon Network started the new series Ben 10.

Cartoon Network launched an action series titled Gransazers on the action block Toonami in January 2007 and later Justirisers on 7 March 2007, and the singer Shankar Mahadevan sang its title track in Hindi. The series after airing all episodes was replaced by Sazer X on 3 July 2007 in which Shaan sung the title track. The Boomerang programming block was launched in August 2007 which aired classic properties like Tom & Jerry, Scooby-Doo, Popeye, and Jackie Chan Adventures.

On 6 December 2008, Cartoon Network India, along with the other Asia Pacific feeds, featured an updated graphics package which was titled the "New Wave Era". It had the 'CN' logo tilted slightly diagonally, as opposed to the previous look of the "City Era".

A few days later, on 11 December 2008, Cartoon Network began to air the next series in the Ben 10 franchise, Ben 10: Alien Force. It also aired new Ben 10 movies.

On 28 June 2009, an episode titled Johnny Goes to Bollywood was aired exclusively in India. The special was produced by Famous House of Animation in Mumbai.

Other notable series acquired by Cartoon Network India were The Adventures of Tintin (2001), Spider-Man: The New Animated Series (2003), Archie's Weird Mysteries (2004), Jumanji (2004), Transformers: Armada (2004), and The Spectacular Spider-Man (2009).

2010s
Cartoon Network started the third series in the Ben 10 franchise, Ben 10: Ultimate Alien on 10 October 2010. Cartoon Network launched Roll No 21 in November 2010, multiple season and TV movies were launched after the success of first season. The new Beyblade series, Beyblade: Metal Fusion started airing from 11 October 2010.

On 1 October 2011, at 9 AM (Indian Standard Time) at the start of The Amazing World of Gumball premiere, Cartoon Network introduced its new branding and logo. Designed by Brand New School, it makes heavy use of the black and white checkerboard motif, as well as CMYK color variations and patterns. The slogan "It's a Fun Thing!" was also introduced. The second season Beyblade: Metal Masters started airing from 22 October 2011.

As the slogan suggests, comedy programs began to occupy most of the timeslots. While initially Tom and Jerry made up most of the time slots, later when Oggy and the Cockroaches was started on the Indian feed in July 2012, CN began to air it hours together each day, which even continued until 2014. In January 2015, Cartoon Network India lost the rights to Oggy and the Cockroaches Seasons 1 to 3, but continued to air Season 4.

CN started the fourth series in the hit Ben 10 franchise, Ben 10: Omniverse on 26 November 2012.

Starting from the new era, "It's a Fun Thing", CN began to air shows without providing any information through airings on the channel, like on-air promos and bumpers. ThunderCats, Beyblade Metal Masters, Beyblade Metal Fury, and Scooby-Doo! Mystery Incorporated were started with no information about air date and timings on the channel, and information present only on TV schedules.

Animated shows like Green Lantern: The Animated Series, DreamWorks Dragons, Scooby-Doo! Mystery Incorporated, The Looney Tunes Show, and ThunderCats aired, but for some reason all of these shows aired only the first seasons, and the second seasons haven't been aired yet. In 2013, The third season Beyblade: Metal Fury started airing from 27 October 2013. Cartoon Network acquired the rights of Krrish franchise's animated film series Kid Krrish. The first movie Kid Krrish on 2 October 2013. The film was followed by three additional movies Kid Krrish: Mission Bhutan (premiered on 19 July 2014), Kid Krrish: Mystery in Mongolia (premiered on 27 September 2014), and Kid Krrish: Shakalaka Africa (premiered on 25 April 2015).	
A television film Chakra: The Invincible based on the character created by Stan Lee aired on 30 November 2013.

CN shifted the hit series Pokémon to its sister channel, in 2011, having aired until the eleventh season, but later brought it back on CN in 2014, starting from the fourteenth season of Pokémon Black and White.

In the summer of 2015, new shows like Uncle Grandpa, Beyblade: Shogun Steel, Clarence, and new episodes of Ben 10 Omniverse started to air. In May 2015, Cartoon Network India celebrated its 20th birthday with specials of various shows including specials from the classic The Flintstones. Starting June 2015, it started to air new promos for each new episode of weekly-once shows like Steven Universe, Ben 10 Omniverse, and Uncle Grandpa.

Cartoon Network celebrated the 20th Anniversary of its Indian feed throughout May 2015. A programming block Happy Birthday Cartoon Network which aired ongoing series like Horrid Henry and Oggy and the Cockroaches as well as classic series like The Flintstones, The Grim Adventures of Billy and Mandy, and Courage the Cowardly Dog.

In December 2015, Cartoon Network aired two specials for the promotion of Hindi film Dilwale. The first special Kris Aur Shahrukh Khan Ki Dilwale Bollywood Class aired on 19 December while Oggy Ki Birthday Party aired on 25 December.

The Powerpuff Girls reboot series premiered on 9 April 2016 in India and other Asian Pacific countries while the Ben 10 reboot premiered on 8 October 2016.

Since 2016, CN India started showing the programmes in 16:9 aspect ratio, however the channel is still natively in 4:3.

In August 2017, Cartoon Network also aired some classic shows during weekend nights on a block called Get Tooned with Toonami, but was abruptly discontinued in October in favour of Dragon Ball Super.

On 10 June 2017, Cartoon Network premiered Craig of the Creek.

On 1 September 2017, the Bang Zoom dub of Dragon Ball Super' started airing weekends on Cartoon Network at a later time slot without any promotion. It was previously aired on Toonami until it became a classic cartoon channel. In mid December 2017, Cartoon Network quietly started airing Dragon Ball Z movies on Sunday nights.

Dragon Ball Super replaced Dragon Ball Z's late night time slot from 1 January 2018 onwards.

In September 2018, Cartoon Network India started to premiere new shows such as Unikitty, OK K.O! Let's Be Heroes, Ben 10 Challenge, and Running Man.

Cartoon Network India brought back the Tom and Jerry franchise in 2019 with Tom and Jerry Tales and The Tom and Jerry Show (2014). It was previously moved to Pogo TV.

Other notable television series launched in 2010s were Horrid Henry (9 April 2012), Teen Titans Go! (23 March 2015), and Mighty Magiswords (6 May 2017).

2020s
In April 2020, Cartoon Network India acquired the ZeeQ television series Bandbudh Aur Budbak. The fourth season of The Tom and Jerry Show was premiered on 14 November 2020 with a new voiceover commentary.

On 22 February 2021, Super Shiro, a spin-off series of Crayon Shin-chan, made its debut in India on Cartoon Network. In March 2021, CN also started Nate is Late. The channel created their own animated series titled Dabangg, based on the film series, on 31 May 2021. On 27 June 2021, the channel premiered its first original CGI animated series, Ekans: Ek Se Badhkar Snake.

The channel celebrated the International Cat Day, with back to back episodes of The Tom and Jerry Show broadcast on 8 August 2021, using the Cat-Toon Network moniker, which was also used by the American network to celebrate April Fools' Day. The third season of Grizzy and The Lemmings titled Grizzy and the Lemmings World Tour was also started from 9 August 2021. A three seven-minute special episode of Lamput premiered on 14 August 2021. On 22 August 2021, the Ben 10,010 movie came on the channel in the form of Ben 10 Special.

In November 2021, Cartoon Network aired the Harry Potter film series. Cartoon Network also began airing Taffy on 24 January 2022.

For celebrating the 82nd anniversary of Tom and Jerry, the channel decide to air Tom and Jerry Tales from 7 to 11 February at 10:30 AM IST onwards. However it was continued until late April 2022 at a different timing with the other series of Tom and Jerry like The Tom and Jerry Show (1975), The Tom and Jerry Show (2014), and its 1940-1975 theatrical shorts. The network also started newer series of Tom and Jerry like Tom and Jerry in New York from 18 March 2022.

On 30 March 2022, Cartoon Network India began using the "Redraw Your World" branding and graphics, like its US and Asian counterparts. With the rebrand, Cartoon Network also announced the launch of the Cartoonito block on the channel.

On 22 May 2022, Cartoon Network India aired the Dragon Ball Super marathon, Dragon Ball Super Sunday.

Programming

 Related channels and units 
 Cartoon Network HD+ Cartoon Network HD+ (CN HD+)''' launched on 15 April 2018 and is an ad free channel. The channel was initially launched in India, but was eventually launched on popular operators in neighbouring countries.

CN HD+ is available in four languages. Programs like We Bare Bears, The Powerpuff Girls, etc, are also available in Hindi, Tamil, and Telugu.

 Pogo TV 

Pogo TV was launched on 1 January 2004. As a companion channel of Cartoon Network, it also aired animated and live-action shows. From 2021, it only aired original Indian animation shows which became it WarnerMedia's only for Indian kids channel. But from 2022, the channel again started international shows like Mr. Bean: The Animated Series, Yo-kai Watch, Grizzy and the Lemmings, etc Also In Hindi Tamil Telugu.

 Toonami 

On 26 February 2015, Turner India launched a new channel based on the mature animation/anime block Toonami. The channel revamped itself in July 2017 as a classic animation channel before ceasing operations completely at the end of 15 May 2018.

Cartoon Network Block
Zee TV launched a Cartoon Network programming block on 14 August 2002, replacing Nickelodeon's programing block. The block featured programs like Scooby-Doo, The Mask: Animated Series, The Powerpuff Girls, Dexter's Laboratory, Pinky and the Brain, Samurai Jack, The Real Adventures of Jonny Quest, The Flintstones, The Jetsons, Tom and Jerry Kids, Superman: The Animated Series, Captain Planet, Ed, Edd N Eddy, The Road Runner Show, Courage the Cowardly Dog, Sheep in the Big City, Mike, Lu & Og, Sylvester and Tweety Mysteries, and Batman: The Animated Series. It aired programs twice in a day.

On 8 July 2006, DD National introduced a Cartoon Network block named "Cartoon Network ki Duniya" which aired programs like Codename: Kids Next Door, M.A.D. (from sister channel Pogo), and Galli Galli Sim Sim.

Digital and OTT deals
On 24 June 2016, Turner India signed a distribution deal with Viacom 18's OTT app Voot. Through this strategic tie-up Voot can stream Turner's properties from Cartoon Network and Pogo TV like The Powerpuff Girls, Ben 10, Dexter's Laboratory, Roll No. 21, Samurai Jack, Johnny Bravo, and M.A.D in their Kids section.

On 29 August 2017, Turner International India signed a deal with Amazon Prime Video India. Through this deal Amazon can stream Cartoon Network shows like Ben 10 (2005 TV series), Ben 10: Alien Force, Ben 10: Ultimate Alien, Ben 10: Omniverse, Johnny Bravo, The Powerpuff Girls, Kumbh Karan, Roll No 21, and Dexter's Laboratory in their Kids and Family section.

 CN+ 
In 2014, Cartoon Network partnered with Tata Sky to launch an active service called CN+. The service is available every day for about one to two hours. It airs select episodes from hit programmes such as Ben 10 (and related series), Beyblade: Metal Fusion (and related series), Cartoon Network Original Shows like The Amazing World of Gumball, League of Super Evil, Tom and Jerry (and related series), Ed, Edd 'n' Eddy, and movies from Ben 10 and Pokémon'' among others.

See also
 Tiny TV, a preschool programming block on Pogo.
 List of Indian animated television series

References

External links

 
Children's television channels in India
English-language television stations in India
Television stations in Mumbai
Television channels and stations established in 1995
1995 establishments in Maharashtra
Turner Broadcasting System Arabic
Indian animation
Hindi-language television channels in India
Warner Bros. Discovery Asia-Pacific